{{Infobox street
| addtoproseorsumpin      =
| name                    = Baker Street
| native_name             =
| marker_image            =
| image                   = Baker Street, W1 - geograph.org.uk - 1752307.jpg
| caption                 =
| former_names            =
| postal_code             = 
| addresses               =
| length_m                =
| length_ft               =
| length_mi               = 0.6
| length_km               =
| length_ref              =
| width                   =
| location                = Westminster, London, England
| metro_system            = Tube
| metro                   =  
| client                  =
| maint                   =
| coordinates             =
| direction_a             =
| terminus_a              = Park Road
| direction_b             =
| terminus_b              = Portman Square
| junction                =
| commissioning_date      =
| construction_start_date =
| completion_date         =
| inauguration_date       =
| demolition_date         =
| north                   =
| south                   =
| east                    =
| west                    =
| known_for               = [[221B Baker Street|Sherlock Holmes residence (221B Baker Street)]]Setting of Gerry Rafferty's hit song}}Baker Street''' is a street in the Marylebone district of the City of Westminster in London. It is named after builder William Baker, who laid out the street in the 18th century. The street is most famous for its connection to the fictional detective Sherlock Holmes, who lived at a fictional 221B Baker Street address on the north of the street. The area was originally high class residential, but now is mainly occupied by commercial premises.

Location
Baker Street is a busy thoroughfare, lying in postcode areas NW1/W1 and forming part of the A41. It used to run south from Regent's Park, the junction with Park Road, parallel to Gloucester Place, meeting Marylebone Road, Portman Square and Wigmore Street. In 2019, the until-then one-way street was changed to accommodate lanes running in both directions.

At the junction with Wigmore Street, Baker Street turns into Orchard Street, which ends when it meets with Oxford Street. After Portman Square the road continues as Orchard Street.

The crossroads of Baker Street and Marylebone Road was historically known as Marylebone Circus, which is still its unofficial name.

History

Baker Street was laid out in the 18th century by the builder William Baker, after whom it is named.

19th century
In 1835, the first wax museum of Madame Tussauds was opened on Baker Street. The museum moved, just around the corner, to Marylebone Road in 1884.

Also in 1835 the sculptor James Fillans came to live and work from 82 Baker Street.

Thomas Charles Druce ran the Baker Street Bazaar (which would become Druce & Co. furniture manufacturers) until his death in 1864, and was later subject of the Druce Portland Case.

20th century
Residents of the prestigious mansion block, Chiltern Court on the Regent's Park end of Baker Street include the novelists Arnold Bennett and H. G. Wells who are commemorated with a blue plaque.

In 1940 the headquarters of the Special Operations Executive moved to 64 Baker Street, they were often called the "Baker Street Irregulars" after Sherlock Holmes' gang of street urchins of the same name.

The Beatles' Apple Boutique was based at 94 Baker Street from 1967 to 1968.

A significant robbery of a branch of Lloyds Bank took place on Baker Street in 1971.

For many years the head office of Marks & Spencer, formerly the United Kingdom's largest retailer, was at "Michael House" (named in parallel with the group's "St Michael" brand), 55 Baker Street, until the company relocated to the Paddington Basin in 2004. This was one of the best known corporate buildings in the United Kingdom, and has since been redeveloped as a modern office complex by London & Regional Properties to a design by Make Architects and Expedition Engineering.

A London County Council blue plaque commemorates Prime Minister William Pitt the Younger who lived at 120 Baker Street from 1803 to 1804. British singer Dusty Springfield lived on Baker Street in the 1960s.

21st century
In February 2019, Baker Street was converted from a one-way southbound street to a two-way street.About Baker Street Two Way Project

Buildings
The Seychelles maintains a Consulate at 111 Baker Street.

Transport
The street is served by the London Underground by Baker Street tube station, one of the world's oldest surviving underground stations. Next door is Transport for London's lost property office.

In popular culture
 In fiction, Sherlock Holmes, Basil of Baker Street (The Great Mouse Detective), Sherlock Hound, Danger Mouse, Sexton Blake, Carland Cross and James Black of Case Closed have all resided along the road.
 "Baker Street" is a song by Gerry Rafferty, released in 1978. The song was a major worldwide hit, reaching Number 3 in the UK and Number 2 on the Billboard Hot 100. Rafferty wrote the song during a time he stayed at the home of friend who lived off Baker Street when in London.
 "Baker St. Muse" is a song from Jethro Tull's album Minstrel in the Gallery, which was released in 1975.  (Baker Street is frequently mentioned in the lyrics of Jethro Tull songs.)
 The 2008 film, The Bank Job'' was based on the 1971 robbery of Lloyds Bank in Baker Street.

Gallery

See also

List of eponymous roads in London

References

External links

Streets in the City of Westminster
Tourist attractions in the City of Westminster